"The Hell Song" is a song by Canadian rock band Sum 41. The song was released on February 10, 2003, as the second single of the band's album Does This Look Infected?. "The Hell Song" became a top-40 hit in Ireland, Italy, and the United Kingdom. On May 29, 2015, it was certified gold by the Recording Industry Association of America (RIAA).

Background
Deryck Whibley, the lead vocalist of Sum 41, wrote "The Hell Song" after learning that one of his friends had contracted HIV. He said, "That song just came out in, like, half an hour when I just found out," Whibley said. "I wasn't even meaning to write about it, but for some reason that just came out right away".

Music video
The music video was of a concert with dolls and action figures, with Sum 41's faces on those "performing" in front of a Lite-Brite screen. They were joined with other action figures such as those of Snoop Dogg, Eminem, Ozzy Osbourne with his family, Marilyn Manson, Korn, Metallica, Eddie the Head, Gene Simmons, Spice Girls, Angus Young, Jesus Christ, Alice Cooper, Destiny's Child, George W. Bush and Ludacris. The dolls' obscene finger gestures and nudity are comically censored, which parodies real life. The video was directed by Marc Klasfeld.

The music video was nominated for Best Breakthrough Video & Best Direction at the 2003 MTV Video Music Awards, losing both awards to Coldplay's "The Scientist".

Track listings

UK CD1
 "The Hell Song" (explicit version)
 "Over My Head (Better Off Dead)" (demo)
 "My Direction" (demo)
 "The Hell Song" (CD-ROM video)

UK CD2
 "The Hell Song" (live)
 "Still Waiting" (live)
 "Rhythms" (live)
 "The Hell Song" (live CD-ROM video)

UK 7-inch single
A. "The Hell Song" (album version—explicit) – 3:18
B. "Still Waiting" (live from Sound, London) – 2:44

European CD single
 "The Hell Song"
 "Over My Head" (demo)

Australian CD single
 "The Hell Song"
 "Over My Head" (demo)
 "My Direction" (demo)
 "WW7 Pts 1 & 2" (performed by "Pain for Pleasure")

Charts

Certifications

Release history

References

External links
 

2002 songs
2003 singles
Aquarius Records (Canada) singles
Island Records singles
Mercury Records singles
Music videos directed by Marc Klasfeld
Songs about HIV/AIDS
Songs written by Deryck Whibley
Songs written by Greig Nori
Sum 41 songs